Knokke Casino (also called Knokke-Heist Casino;) is a sea-front casino in the town of Knokke, in the administrative community Knokke-Heist, in the province of West Flanders in Flanders, Belgium.

Description
The largest of Belgium's ten casinos, it is known for its permanent large-scale artworks by Keith Haring, René Magritte, and Paul Delvaux. It is the first of four casinos, in different Belgian towns, designed by Belgian architect Léon Stynen. The architectural style is said to have been influenced by Le Corbusier, along with Art Deco and the designer's Beaux-Arts training.

The late-1920s building was severely damaged during the Second World War. A subsequent renovation allowed surrealist master Magritte to create a giant 360° mural, finished in 1953, comprising eight panels called The Enchanted Domain.

It shows a surreal outdoors panorama, depicting "the cave, the thick forest, the naked or dressed girls, the trains and tracks meticulously illustrated in the small station, the lights and electricity poles, the moon, the mailbox".

The  (chandelier room) contains a 6-ton chandelier made of Venetian crystal. Some 22,000 pieces of glass were used and 2,700 lamps light up the main hall. It was created by architect J. Selis and designer Al David.

Former members of the Casino's orchestra include, in the 1930s, composer and violist, Jef Maes.

History 
In 1929, Jozef Nellens began construction for the casino, which was soon officially opened on July 5, 1930. Nellens managed the business until his death in 1934, when his son Gustave Nellens took over. The casino was only open four months out of each year, during the summer season.

During World War II, the casino was partially occupied by German troops and heavily damaged by air raids. The building was restored by the original architect Léon Stynen, and was reopened in 1947.

Beginning in 1949, major exhibitions were organized every summer, displaying works by artists such as Pablo Picasso, Max Ernst, Salvador Dalí, and René Magritte. Other artists exhibited in the annual shows included Balthus, Joan Miró, Raoul Dufy, Paul Delvaux, Jean Tinguely, and Nikki de Saint Phalle.

The popularity of the casino grew with musical performances featuring artists such as Ray Ventura, Josephine Baker, Édith Piaf, Frank Sinatra, Nat King Cole, and Jacques Brel. 

In the 1960s, the casino began opening year-round, as visitor traffic increased. In 1971, Jacques and Roger Nellens took over the management of the casino following the death of their father. The entertainment program was expanded with ballets, operas, concerts, poetry recitals, and film festivals; some events were televised. In 1987, further renovations were made to the building which resulted in the casino's current appearance. In 1990, the casino was recognized as part of the Flemish architectural heritage.

Events 
Among the events held at the casino are finals of the Miss Belgium contest, competitions to select the Belgian entry for the Eurovision Song Contest, and the premiere of Hugo Claus' dramatic sketch .

In July 1963, Jacques Brel headlined at casino for the fifth . During this engagement, he performed the classic "Mathilde" for the first time.

References

External links 

  (English page)

Casinos in Belgium
West Flanders
René Magritte
1953 in art
1930 establishments in Belgium
Knokke-Heist